Divorce Invitation is a 2012 American romantic comedy film directed by S. V. Krishna Reddy and co-written by Robert Naturman and Bala Rajasekharuni.<ref>{{Cite web | url=https://www.thewrap.com/jamie-lynn-sigler-star-indian-companys-first-us-film-29548/ | title='The Sopranos Jamie-Lynn Sigler to Star in Indian Company's First U.S. Film | date=28 July 2011 }}</ref> It was produced by R. R. Venkat and co-produced by M S P Srinivas Reddy. Upon release, the film received mixed reviews. The movie is based on director's own 1997 Telugu movie Aahvaanam.

 Plot 
Mike Christian falls in love with a Jewish girl, Dylan Lipnick. Her grandparents initially disapprove, but finally agree to their marriage after Mike converts to Judaism. Dylan's parents' divorce badly affected her and she draws up with a long prenup that Mike signs without reading. They honeymoon and return to the house the grandparents have bought for them. 

After four months of marriage, Mike comes up with the idea of franchising the family business to make money, he is joined in this by his best pal Scotty. After putting together a business plan they approach a large business only to find the CEO is on her way to a golf/business week. Dylan takes out a new Visa card to allow Mike to track the CEO down and broker the business deal because this will make for a "happy husband". Mike tracks the CEO down in Scottsdale, Arizona and finds she is actually Alex Birch, the girl he was supposed to take to prom 13 years earlier and did not happen due to interference from her dad. The spark that was there before reignites and they start a relationship. Mike e-mails Dylan to ask for a divorce and immediately afterwards finds out she is pregnant. Following the prenup, Dylan refuses the divorce; the prenup has a clause that a divorce can only happen with a formal divorce ceremony, with everyone from the original wedding and the bride and groom in their original clothes. This has to be followed by a formal ceremony paid for by the person wanting a divorce. Also, the person bringing the divorce has to explain the reasons.

Mike spends a lot of time organizing the ceremony and getting people to attend. On the day of the divorce ceremony, he decides he loves Dylan and apologizes to Alex, and stays with his wife.

Cast
 Jonathan Bennett as Mike
 Jamie-Lynn Sigler as Dylan
 Nadia Bjorlin as Alex
 Maeve Quinlan as Pam
 Elliott Gould as Dylan's grandfather
 Lainie Kazan as Dylan's grandmother
 Paul Sorvino as  Daniel Miller 
 Richard Kind as George Mason
 Andrea Bowen as Melanie

ProductionDivorce Invitation was reported to be a remake of S. V. Krishna Reddy's 1997 Indian Telugu-language film Aahvaanam'', however, Reddy denied the same by saying that it's a completely different subject.

References

External links 
 
 

2010s English-language films
2010s female buddy films
2012 films
2012 romantic comedy films
American female buddy films
American romantic comedy films
Films directed by S. V. Krishna Reddy
Films set in Chicago
2010s American films